Bujáki is a surname. Notable people with the surname include:

 Bence Bujaki (born 1993), Hungarian BMX rider
 József Bujáki (born 1975), Hungarian footballer
 Merridee Bujaki, Canadian professor of accounting

Hungarian-language surnames